Hartston is a surname of English origin. People with that name include:

 Jana Bellin (born Jana Malypetrová, 1947), Czech-born British chess player, formerly married to William Hartston
 William Hartston (born 1947), English journalist, chess player and chess author
 William Hartston (physician) (1904–1980), English physician, president of the History of Medicine Society of the Royal Society of Medicine 1973–1975

See also
 

Surnames of English origin